Daniel Reynolds or Dan Reynolds may refer to:

Dan Reynolds (born 1987), American singer and songwriter, member of Imagine Dragons
Dan Reynolds (cartoonist) (born 1960), American cartoonist
Daniel H. Reynolds (1832–1902), Confederate States Army brigadier general
Daniel J. Reynolds (1944–2019), American judge
 Danny Reynolds (baseball) (1919–2007), American baseball player
 Danny Reynolds (footballer) (born 1997), English footballer
Daniel Reynolds, designer of Malabar (typeface)